In Norse mythology, Ýdalir ("yew-dales") is a location containing a dwelling owned by the god Ullr. Ýdalir is solely attested in the Poetic Edda, compiled in the 13th century from earlier traditional sources. Scholarly theories have been proposed about the implications of the location.

Attestations
Ýdalir is solely attested in stanza 5 of the poem Grímnismál (collected in the Poetic Edda), where Odin (disguised as Grímnir) tells the young Agnar that Ullr owns a dwelling in Ýdalir. The stanza reads (Ýdalir is here translated as Ydalir):
Ydalir it is called, where Ullr
has himself a dwelling made.
Alfheim the gods Frey gave
in days of yore for a tooth-gift.

Theories
Discussing Ýdalir, Henry Adams Bellows comments that "the wood of the yew-tree was used for bows in the North just as it was long afterwards for England." Rudolf Simek says that "this connexion of the god with the yew-tree, of whose wood bows were made (cf. ON ýbogi 'yew bow'), has led to Ullr being seen as a bow-god." Andy Orchard comments that Ýdalir is an "aptly named dwelling-place [for the] archer-god, Ull." According to Hilda Ellis Davidson, while Valhalla "is well known because it plays so large a part in images of warfare and death," the significance of other halls in Norse mythology such as Ýdalir, and the goddess Freyja's afterlife location Fólkvangr has been lost.

Udale, located in Cromarty, Scotland, is first recorded in 1578, and is thought to derive from Old Norse y-dalr. Robert Bevan-Jones proposes a connection between veneration of Ullr and Ýdalir among the settling pagan Norse in Scotland and their bestowment of the name ydalr to the location.

Notes

References

 Bellows, Henry Adams (Trans.) (2004). The Poetic Edda: The Mythological Poems. Courier Dover Publicans. 
 Bevan-Jones, Robert (2002). The Ancient Yew: A History of Taxus baccata. Windgather Press. 
 Davidson, Hilda Roderick Ellis (1993). The Lost Beliefs of Northern Europe (illustrated edition). Routledge. 
 Thorpe, Benjamin (Trans.) (1907). The Elder Edda of Saemund Sigfusson. Norrœna Society.
 Orchard, Andy (1997). Dictionary of Norse Myth and Legend. Cassell. 
 Simek, Rudolf (2007) translated by Angela Hall. Dictionary of Northern Mythology. D.S. Brewer. 

Locations in Norse mythology